(German for 'spirit') is a distilled beverage obtained by maceration of unfermented fruit or other raw materials in neutral spirits, followed by distillation. This differs from fruit brandy, where the alcohol comes from fermenting the fruit's naturally occurring sugars. As such, geist can be made from a much wider range of materials, as it is not limited to fruits with sufficient fermentable sugars.

Geist can be produced from a single material (like Himbeergeist) or a combination of multiple ingredients. 

Akvavit, most gins and white absinthes legally meet the description to be considered a geist, although they have more specific legal definitions.

European Union

Geist 
As per the EU regulations that define of spirit drinks, geist must be produced by maceration of unfermented fruits and berries or vegetables, nuts, other plant materials, such as herbs, rose petals, or mushrooms, in ethyl alcohol of agricultural origin, followed by distillation.

Geist must contain at least 37.5% alcohol by volume, it cannot contain added colours or flavours, and it may not contain more than 10 grams of sweetening products per litre (expressed as invert sugar).

Spirit obtained by maceration and distillation 
Geist can also be named "Spirit obtained by maceration and distillation" only if it has been produced from the following fruits, berries or nuts:

 chokeberry
 black chokeberry
 chestnut
 citrus fruits
 hazelnut
 crowberry
 strawberry
 sea-buckthorn
 hollyberry
 cornel cherry or cornelian cherry
 walnut
 banana
 myrtle
 prickly pear
 passion fruit
 bird cherry
 sloe
 blackcurrant
 white currant
 redcurrant
 gooseberry
 rosehip
 arctic bramble
 cloudberry
 blackberry
 raspberry
 elderberry
 rowanberry
 sorb apple
 wild service tree
 ambarella
 hog plum
 high bush blueberry
 wild cranberry
 bilberry/blueberry
 cowberry

Elderberry geist can therefore be named "Elderberry spirit obtained by maceration and distillation" but elderflower geist cannot.

See also 

 Eau de vie
 Liquor
 List of alcoholic drinks

References 

Alcoholic drinks
Distilled drinks